The Rovers may refer to:

 The Irish Rovers, Canadian-Irish folk group created in 1963 that renamed itself The Rovers for part of the 1980s
 The Rovers (album), 1980 album by the above group
 The Rovers (TV series), Australian family adventure TV series, 1969–1970
 Rovers (UK TV series), British comedy, 2016-
 Blackburn Rovers F.C., English Premier League football (soccer) club
 Mars rover, explorer craft on the planet Mars
 Rovers Return Inn, a fictional pub on the British television soap opera Coronation Street